The 1997 Kansas Jayhawks football team represented the University of Kansas in the 1997 NCAA Division I-A football season. They participated as members of the Big 12 Conference in the North Division. They were coached by head coach Terry Allen. They played their home games at Memorial Stadium in Lawrence, Kansas.

Schedule

Some sources cite the record at 6 wins and 5 losses due to a forfeit from Colorado after the game was played.  However, Colorado was not required to change the record and some sources will show the season record at 5 wins and 6 losses.

Game summaries

UAB

TCU

Missouri

Cincinnati

Oklahoma

Texas Tech

Colorado

Nebraska

Iowa State

Kansas State

Texas

References

Kansas
Kansas Jayhawks football seasons
Kansas Jayhawks football